The Asia/Oceania Zone was one of the three zones of the regional Davis Cup competition in 1997.

In the Asia/Oceania Zone there were four different tiers, called groups, in which teams competed against each other to advance to the upper tier. The top two teams in Group III advanced to the Asia/Oceania Zone Group II in 1998, whereas the bottom two teams were relegated to the Asia/Oceania Zone Group IV in 1998.

Participating nations

Draw
 Venue: Khalifa International Tennis and Squash Complex, Doha, Qatar
 Date: 26–30 March

Group A

Group B

1st to 4th place play-offs

5th to 8th place play-offs

Final standings

  and  promoted to Group II in 1998.
  and  relegated to Group IV in 1998.

Round robin

Group A

Bangladesh vs. Kuwait

Bahrain vs. Kazakhstan

Bangladesh vs. Kazakhstan

Bahrain vs. Kuwait

Bangladesh vs. Bahrain

Kazakhstan vs. Kuwait

Group B

Qatar vs. Malaysia

Pacific Oceania vs. Sri Lanka

Qatar vs. Sri Lanka

Malaysia vs. Pacific Oceania

Qatar vs. Pacific Oceania

Malaysia vs. Sri Lanka

1st to 4th place play-offs

Semifinals

Kazakhstan vs. Qatar

Kuwait vs. Pacific Oceania

Final

Qatar vs. Pacific Oceania

3rd to 4th play-off

Kazakhstan vs. Kuwait

5th to 8th place play-offs

5th to 8th play-offs

Bahrain vs. Malaysia

Bangladesh vs. Sri Lanka

5th to 6th play-off

Malaysia vs. Sri Lanka

7th to 8th play-off

Bahrain vs. Bangladesh

References

External links
Davis Cup official website

Davis Cup Asia/Oceania Zone
Asia Oceania Zone Group III